The Dead & Company 2015 Tour was a tour by the band Dead & Company that took place between October and December 2015. It was the band's debut tour.

Overview

Following the surviving Grateful Dead members' successful Fare Thee Well concerts during the summer of 2015 Bob Weir,  Bill Kreutzmann and Mickey Hart formed a band called Dead & Company with John Mayer, Jeff Chimenti and Oteil Burbridge. The tour was sponsored by American Express.

The band initially announced one concert for October 31 at Madison Square Garden in New York City. Following the presale for that show they announced another show at Madison Square Garden for the following night. On August 24 a full ten date tour was announced. The tour was extended to include a total of 21 dates on September 10. One additional concert at Madison Square Garden was later announced for November 7. This was a free show and was filmed and broadcast as part of the American Express Unstaged series. Fans were given the opportunity to win tickets through the band's website. Additional tickets were also given away by John Mayer's fan forum and by HeadCount outside of Madison Square Garden at the band's November 1 show.

Reception
The tour was very well-received, with The New York Times referring to its "tremendous success" and Billboard calling the shows "magical".  Mayer's playing was particularly praised; a review of the 11/21 Minneapolis show said that since original Grateful Dead lead guitarist Jerry Garcia's passing, "there's been no finer 'Jerry' than the uber-talented Mayer".

Tour dates
The band performed a total of 22 concerts in sixteen different cities.

Musicians
Mickey Hart – drums, percussion
Bill Kreutzmann – drums
John Mayer – lead guitar, lead/backing vocals
Bob Weir – rhythm guitar, lead/backing vocals
Oteil Burbridge – bass guitar, percussion, backing vocals
Jeff Chimenti – keyboards, backing vocals

References

External links
Dead & Company official website

2015 concert tours
Dead & Company concert tours